Hook Meadow and The Trap Grounds is a  biological Site of Special Scientific Interest on the northern outskirts of Oxford in Oxfordshire.

These unimproved meadows in the floodplain of the River Thames are poorly drained and they have calcareous clay soils. The southern field is the most waterlogged, and its flora includes wetland species such as sharp-flowered rush, marsh arrow grass, common spike-rush and early marsh orchid.

The site is private land with no public access.

See also
 Burgess Field Nature Park
 Trap Grounds

References

1986 establishments in England
Sites of Special Scientific Interest in Oxfordshire
Parks and open spaces in Oxford